The 33rd Filipino Academy of Movie Arts and Sciences Awards Night was held in 1985 at the Araneta Coliseum in the Philippines .  This is for the Outstanding Achievements of the different  films for the year 1984.

Ang Padrino won the most awards including the FAMAS Award for Best Picture and best director for Fernando Poe Jr.  This is also Nora Aunor's 10th straight nominations and 3rd win as best actress for the film Bulaklak sa City Jail.  Aunor shared the recognition with Sharon Cuneta for her movie "Dapat ka bang Mahalin", this is only the second time in FAMAS history.  FAMAS also gave out the first Best Visual Effects award which was won by "Ang Panday" and Best Sound Effects 

Awards

Major Awards
Winners are listed first and highlighted with boldface.

{| class=wikitable
|-
! style="background:#EEDD82; width:50%" | Best Picture
! style="background:#EEDD82; width:50%" | Best Director
|-
| valign="top" |
 Ang Padrino — FPJ Productions Pasukuin si Waway — Vanguard Films 
 Bulaklak ng City Jail — Cherubin Films 
 Misteryo sa Tuwa — Experimental Cinema of the Philippines 
 Pieta: Ikalawang Aklat — Amazaldy Film Productions 
 Sister Stella L. — Regal Films
 Working Girls — VIVA Films 
 Nang Masugatan ang Gabi — HPS Production
| valign="top" |
 Fernando Poe Jr. — Ang Padrino Mario O'Hara — Bulaklak sa City Jail 
 Manuel Fyke Cinco — Pasukuin si Waway 
 Danny L. Zialcita —  Nang Masugatan ang Gabi 
 Carlo J. Caparas — Pieta: Ikalawang Aklat 
 Mike De Leon — Sister Stella L. 
 Ishmael Bernal — Working Girls 
|-
! style="background:#EEDD82; width:50%" | Best Actor
! style="background:#EEDD82; width:50%" | Best Actress
|-
| valign="top" |
 Rudy Fernandez — Pasukuin si Waway Philip Salvador — Baby Tsina
 Ace Vergel — Basag ang Pula 
 Chiquito — Lovingly Yours, Helen (The Movie) 
 Ramon Revilla Jr. — Pieta: Ikalawang Aklat 
 Fernando Poe Jr. — Sigaw ng Katarungan 
| valign="top" |
 Nora Aunor — Bulaklak sa City Jail Sharon Cuneta — Dapat Ka Bang Mahalin Vilma Santos — Sister Stella L. 
 Maricel Soriano — Kaya kong Abutin ang Langit 
 Coney Reyes — Ang Padrino 
 Stella Strada — Puri 
 Vivian Velez — Pieta: Ikalawang Aklat 
|-
! style="background:#EEDD82; width:50%" | Best Supporting Actor
! style="background:#EEDD82; width:50%" | Best Supporting Actress
|-
| valign="top" |
 Celso Ad Castillo — Sampung Ahas ni Eva Tony Santos — Sister Stella L. Dindo Fernando — Baby Tsina 
 Tommy Abuel — Kriminal 
 Zandro Zamora — Ang Padrino 
 Paquito Diaz — Ang Panday IV 
 George Estregan — Sa Bulaklak ng Apoy
| valign="top" |
 Perla Bautista — Bulaklak sa City Jail Caridad Sanchez — Baby Tsina 
 Bella Flores — Mga Batang Yagit Gina Pareño — Bukas Luluhod ang mga Tala 
 Gloria Romero — Condemned 
 Gina Alajar — Kaya kong Abutin ang Langit 
 Laurice Guillen — Sister Stella L. 
|-
! style="background:#EEDD82; width:50%" | Best Child Actor
! style="background:#EEDD82; width:50%" | Best Child Actress
|-
| valign="top" |
  Chuckie Dreyfus — Idol
 Tomtom — Mga batang Yagit 
 Jaypee de Guzman — Nang Maghalo ang Balat sa Tinalupan 
 Christopher Paloma — Ang Panday IV 
 Romnick Sarmienta — Pieta" Ikalawang Aklat 
 Eric Francisco — Pusakal 
 Joko Diaz — Sigaw ng Katarungan 
| valign="top" |
 Rose Ann Gonzales — Kriminal 
 Jocelyn De la Cruz — Mga Batang Yagit
 Janet Elisa Giron — Bukas Luluhod ang mga Tala 
Manilyn Reynes — Dear Mama
 Jennifer Sevilla — Kapitan Inggo
 Ajay Marquez — Kaya kong Abutin ang Langit
 Sheryl Cruz — Lovingly Yours, Helen (The Movie)
|-
! style="background:#EEDD82; width:50%" | Best in Screenplay
! style="background:#EEDD82; width:50%" | Best Story
|-
| valign="top" |
  Fernando Poe Jr. (as Ronwaldo Reyes), Eddie Romero, Fred Navarro — Ang Padrino 
 Lualhati Bautista — Bulaklak sa City Jail
| valign="top" |
  Carlo J. Caparas — Somewhere
 Nerissa Cabral — Bukas Luluhod ang mga Tala
|-
! style="background:#EEDD82; width:50%" | Best Sound 
! style="background:#EEDD82; width:50%" | Best Musical Score
|-
| valign="top" |
  Rolly Ruta —   Bukas Luluhod ang mga Tala 
| valign="top" |
    Willy Cruz — Bukas Luluhod ang mga Tala 
|-
! style="background:#EEDD82; width:50%" | Best Cinematography 
! style="background:#EEDD82; width:50%" | Best Editing
|-
| valign="top" |
   Romy Vitug  — Kung Mahawi Man Ang Ulap  
| valign="top" |
  Jess Navarro —  Sister Stella L. 
|-
! style="background:#EEDD82; width:50%" |  Best Theme Song
! style="background:#EEDD82; width:50%" | Production Design
|-
| valign="top" |
  George Canseco — Dapat Ka Bang Mahalin
| valign="top" |
  Steve Paolo — Alapaap 
|-
! style="background:#EEDD82; width:50%" |  Best Visual Effects
! style="background:#EEDD82; width:50%" | Best Sound Effects
|-
| valign="top" |
  Ramjie — Ang Panday IV
| valign="top" |
  Demet Velasquez — Bagets 
|-
|}

Special Awardee

Lou Salvador, Sr. Memorial Award
Bert "Tawa" Marcelo
Dr. Jose Perez Memorial Award
Billy Balbastro
Lifetime Achievement Award
Levi Celerio

Hall of Fame Awardee
Charito Solis - Actress
1984 - Don't Cry For Me Papa
1969 - Igorota
1964 - Angustia
1961 - Emily
1960 - Kundiman Ng Lahi
Best Dressed Movie Star (Bida Ng Gabi) 
Carmi Martin

References

External links
FAMAS Awards 

FAMAS Award
FAMAS
FAMAS